The 17th Venice Biennale, held in 1930, was an exhibition of international contemporary art, with 11 participating nations. The Venice Biennale takes place biennially in Venice, Italy.

References

Bibliography

Further reading 

 
 
 
 
 
 
 
 
 
 
 
 
 
 
 
 
 
 
 
 
 
 
 
 

1930 in art
1930 in Italy
Venice Biennale exhibitions